Villers-le-Lac is a commune in the Doubs department in the Bourgogne-Franche-Comté region in eastern France.

Geography 
The commune lies in the Jura mountains on the Swiss border.

Population

See also
Communes of the Doubs department

References

External links 

  

Communes of Doubs
Doubs communes articles needing translation from French Wikipedia